The gothic dart or subgothic dart (Feltia subgothica) is a moth of the family Noctuidae. It is found in central North America, north to Quebec, Ontario and Saskatchewan.

The wingspan is about 34 mm. Adults are on wing from July to September.

Larvae have been reported from over 40 plant species including crops, forages, vegetables and forbs.

External links
Bug Guide
Images

Noctuinae
Moths of North America